Grand Designs Australia is an Australian spin-off of the British TV series Grand Designs. The show documents people who attempt to build a custom-designed house and the challenges they face. It is aired on The LifeStyle Channel and is hosted by the architect Peter Maddison.

The series renewed more episodes for the 10th season in October 2022 at Foxtel’s 2023 upfronts, which is split into two parts and will be the final season of the series.

Format
The Australian edition follows its British lead and, generally, begins with Maddison meeting the individuals constructing a "unique" build; this is followed by a CAD (Computer Aided Design, produced by Our Vision) of the layout of the build. As the build progresses, Maddison visits the site to interview the build clients and will, occasionally, interview other persons relevant to the project such as architects and site managers. Finally, Maddison visits the site, at a planned end of the build and interviews the project clients on life in their new house (if completed) and the challenges they encountered in pursuing the project.

Episodes and spin-offs 

A two-part spin-off series titled Grand Designs Australia Revisited premiered on 15 April 2013. The series featured the Surry Hills Small House and the Clovelly Modular episodes.

Broadcast
The series has aired on Channel 4 in the United Kingdom.

Exhibition
Grand Designs Australia Live launched in Sydney in October 2011 and again in Melbourne in September 2012.

References

External links
 Grand Designs Australia at TV3
 LifeStyle Channel page for Grand Designs Australia
 
 'Interview: Peter Maddison on Grand Designs Australia' in Australian Design Review (23 September 2010)

Lifestyle (Australian TV channel) original programming
2010s Australian reality television series
2010 Australian television series debuts
Television series by Fremantle (company)
Australian television series based on British television series
2020s Australian reality television series